Erik Jensen (1 October 1921 – 29 June 1987) was a Danish boxer. He competed in the men's light heavyweight event at the 1948 Summer Olympics. At the 1948 Summer Olympics, he lost to Chuck Spieser of the United States.

References

1921 births
1987 deaths
Danish male boxers
Olympic boxers of Denmark
Boxers at the 1948 Summer Olympics
Sportspeople from Aarhus
Light-heavyweight boxers